Dakhan (also Romanized as Dakhān and Dokhān; also known as Koreja State, KWO, and KWO) is a town in Shikarpur District, Sindh Province, Pakistan. At the 2006 census, its population was 1064, in 280 families.

References 

Populated places in Saveh County